Stuff Stephanie in the Incinerator (originally titled In Deadly Heat) is a 1989 horror-comedy written and directed by Don Nardo and distributed by Troma Entertainment.

Premise
A wealthy couple and their friend enter a world of sadistic fantasy games of the rich, but as they travel deeper, it becomes difficult to establish exactly what is a game and what is not.

Tagline
Don't throw your love away. Burn it.

References

External links
 

1989 films
American independent films
Troma Entertainment films
1989 horror films
1980s English-language films
1980s American films